Edward A. Ball (4 November 1939 – 17 April 1995) was an Australian professional golfer. He won several dozen significant tournaments in his career.

Golf career 
Ball was born in Hornsby, New South Wales. He had a decorated amateur career, including a win at the Australian Amateur in 1960, along with several other amateur victories. He turned professional in the early 1960s and found immediate success. He won his first title in 1962 at the Queensland Open. He added numerous wins after that internationally. He staged one of Australian golf's greatest comebacks to win the Wills Masters in 1973 and in 1974 became the first player to successfully defend the Wills title. He shot rounds of 70, 69, 72 and 70 at The Australian Golf Club in Sydney to win by two strokes; this is said to be the greatest achievement in his career.

Amateur wins
1960 Australian Amateur, New South Wales Champion of Champions, New South Wales Amateur

Professional wins (50)

PGA Tour of Australasia wins (3)

PGA Tour of Australasia playoff record (0–3)

Other Australian wins (13)
1962 Queensland Open
 1963 Metalcraft Tournament (tie with Peter Thomson)
 1964 Wagga City Open, City of Sydney Open, Tasmanian Open, New South Wales Open, Wills Classic
1965 Lakes Open
 1968 Queensland PGA Championship
1970 City of Sydney Open
1972 South Australian Open
1973 South Australian Open
1977 New South Wales PGA Championship

Asia Golf Circuit wins (2)
1964 Singapore Open
1975 Indian Open

Other wins (1)
this list is incomplete
1977 Papua New Guinea Open

Team appearances
Amateur
Eisenhower Trophy (representing Australia): 1960
Australian Men's Interstate Teams Matches (representing New South Wales): 1960 (winners)

Professional
World Cup (representing Australia): 1974

References

Australian male golfers
PGA Tour of Australasia golfers
People from the North Shore, Sydney
1939 births
1995 deaths